Taykonyr is a village in Sozak District in Turkestan Region of Kazakhstan. It is part of the Kyzemshek rural district (KATO code - 515645200). Population:

Geography
The village lies in the Ashchykol Depression close to a small lake.

References

Populated places in Turkistan Region